Tiapoum is a town in south-eastern Ivory Coast. It is a sub-prefecture of and the seat of Tiapoum Department in Sud-Comoé Region, Comoé District. Tiapoum is also a commune. The town sits on the north shore of the Tano River, which in this area forms the border between Ivory Coast and Ghana. In 2014, the population of the sub-prefecture of Tiapoum was 25,072.

Villages
The eighteen villages of the sub-prefecture of Tiapoum and their population in 2014 were:

References

Sub-prefectures of Sud-Comoé
Communes of Sud-Comoé